Football 5-a-side at the 2016 Summer Paralympics was held in Rio at the Olympic Tennis Centre, from 9 to 17 September. Football 5-a-side was played by athletes with visual impairment, with a ball with a noise making device inside.

For these games, the men competed in an 8-team tournament. Brazil were hosts, reigning three times Paralympic champions, and the favorites since they won both in Athens 2004, Beijing 2008 and London 2012; they were also the defending world and PanAmerican champions.

Classification

The International Paralympic Committee recognizes three classifications for the purposes of this event, all involving various degrees of limited sight, ranging from total lack of sight to the ability to make out shapes at short distances – B1, B2 and B3. However, the event is made fair and open to all abilities within the broader classification by the use of eyemasks by all players.

Medallists

Qualification

Eight teams will contest the competition, which is for male athletes only.

An NPC can enter a single squad, consisting of eight players, plus 2 sighted goalkeepers – goalkeepers are not included in the athlete quota of 64; both goalkeepers however, in line with Paralympic practice on able bodied guides and competitors' in other events, are eligible for medals.

Squads

Tournament

Group A

Group B

Knockout stage

Classification round

7th–8th place match

5th–6th place match

Medal round

Semi-finals

Bronze medal match

Gold medal match

Final rankings

Source: Paralympic.org

See also
 Football 7-a-side at the 2016 Summer Paralympics
 Football at the 2016 Summer Olympics

References

External links

 
2016
2016 Summer Paralympics events
Paralympics
2016